Claudiu Nicușor Stan (born 25 September 2001) is a Romanian professional footballer who plays as a central midfielder.

Club career

Dinamo București
He made his Liga I debut for Dinamo București against FC Farul Constanța on 20 December 2021.

Career statistics

Club

References

External links

 Claudiu Stan at lpf.ro

2001 births
Living people
Footballers from Bucharest
Romanian footballers
Association football midfielders
FC Dinamo București players
Liga I players
Romania youth international footballers